NGC 4777 is an intermediate spiral ring galaxy. It is estimated to be about 180 million light-years (or about 54 Megaparsecs) away from the Sun. It was discovered on March 3, 1786 by the astronomer William Herschel.

References

External links 

Virgo (constellation)
Intermediate spiral galaxies
Ring galaxies
4777
43852